Darius Bell and The Glitter Pool is a 2009 children's novel by Australian author Odo Hirsch.

Synopsis

Darius Bell and his family are living in the Bell estate, the mansion given to his ancestors, under the condition that every 25 years they would produce a gift for the town. The next gift (meant to be given by Darius’ father) is coming up shortly.

Darius soon discovers that his father has no gift to give to the town and that his family is broke. Even though the gift can be anything, even a barrel of vegetables, Darius’ father insists that the gift needs to be astonishing and needs to honour the Bell name. Then, an earthquake happened and Darius goes outside to assess the damage.

Darius then discovers, that due to the earthquake, a hole in the ground had opened up. Along with his two friends, Oliver and Paul, Darius goes down into the hole, and discovers that inside the hole, was what he believed to be rubies and gold.
Darius is really excited about the “gems” and believes that the Glitter Pool is the solution to all his problems. He even starts fantasizing about revealing the Glitter Pool to his parents. But first, Darius decides that he needs to go to an expert to confirm that it truly was ruby and gold. This is where Darius goes and seeks help from the geology professor, Professor Heggarty, who unfortunately breaks the truth to Darius and tells him that it isn’t ruby and gold, and is instead limonite and vanadinite. This is Darius’ darkest moment.

The next part of the story is where Darius learns a big lesson. He takes Marguerite down to the Glitter Pool and tells her that it is worthless. She then tells him that she prefers it that way, because if it had high financial value, all the gems would be torn down, but this way, the beauty of it is intact and she can look at it. She specified that she would rather have this sight as a gift then any number of gems around her neck.

So Darius is transformed and sees the world at a whole new perspective. He now knows that value is not just money. He decides that if Marguerite likes the Glitter Pool for its beauty, then others will too. He decides to give the town the gift of being able to see the Glitter Pool. But first, he needed to fix up the Glitter Pool so that it was fit and safe for visiting.
After requesting help from friends to fix up the pool and getting really excited about the revelation of the Glitter Pool, Darius discovers that the Glitter Pool can’t be used as the gift because it is on the land that is part of the Bell estate.
Darius and his family have no choice but to give a barrel of vegetables as their gift and the mayor starts mocking them, but then Hector (Darius’ father) stands up to Mayor Podcock and makes him feel like dirt. Darius then realises that an extreme gift wasn’t necessary, not even the Glitter Pool. He also learns that a gift is better given from free will rather than from obligation.
Afterwards, as the Bells are driving home, they notice that heaps of people are crowded around the Glitter Pool, and Darius’ parents find out about everything that Darius has done and they are very proud of him. Even Cyrus, Darius’ older brother who is convinced that Darius is completely useless admits that he is not a complete waste of space.

Life is back to normal for the Bell family, but now everyone has a newfound respect for Darius and they have all learned two very important lessons.

Reception
A review in Booklist of Darius Bell and the Glitter Pool wrote ".. this gentle, appealing story would make a terrific read-aloud for a young audience.", and The Horn Book Magazine called it "..  a satisfying read." The School Library Journal found it ".. not religious, nor is it about any particular holiday, but it is a brilliant book to use and recommend for those who want to read about the true spirit of gift giving and receiving."

Darius Bell and the Glitter Pool has also been reviewed by Magpies, Kirkus Reviews, Australian Women Online, The Age, and ''Library Media Connection.

It won the 2010 CBCA Children's Book of the Year Award for Younger Readers.

References

External links

Library holdings of Darius Bell and the Glitter Pool

Australian children's novels
2009 Australian novels
2009 children's books
Australian fantasy novels